Ikire is a town in Osun State, in south-western Nigeria. It is a place where local cash crops (cacao, palm oil, and kernels) are brought together. It is also a place where yams, corn (maize), cassava (manioc), palm produce, cotton, and kola nuts are sold.

Historical background
Prince Akinere, a renowned elephant hunter founded the Ikire Township.

Geographical feature
Irewole Local Government, Ikire is highly blessed with a conducive climate. The availability of the fine climate has broadly enhanced the cultivation of Arable and cash crops, which has further contributed to the economic development of the area.
In addition, the vegetation cover of the Local Government Area is typically evergreen rainforest that is normally luxuriant during the raining season. The presence of the evergreen luxuriant forest has aided the rearing of cattle and other domestic animals at the Irewole Local Government Area.

Education

Senior high schools:
 Ayedaade Government High School
 Baptist Grammar School, Oke-Ako, Ikire
  Fatima College, Ikire
  St.Augustine, Sanngo, Ikire
New generation nursery and primary school
  College of Humanities and Culture, Osun State University, Ikire Campus

References

Populated places in Osun State
Towns in Yorubaland